The Catawba Valley Railway was a shortline railway that operated in northern South Carolina in the early 20th century.

The 22-mile route was begun by the Southern Power Company (later Duke Power), which built about 10 miles of track from Great Falls, South Carolina, to Fort Lawn, South Carolina, in 1906.

The road was taken over by the Catawba Valley Railway Company in 1907 and extended another 12 miles northward to meet the Seaboard Air Line Railroad near Catawba, South Carolina.

The Seaboard Air Line Railroad controlled the Catawba Valley Railway until it purchased the Catawaba Valley in 1909.

References

Defunct South Carolina railroads
Railway companies established in 1907
Railway companies disestablished in 1909
Predecessors of the Seaboard Air Line Railroad
American companies established in 1907